A Treaty of Accession to the European Union is a  treaty of the European Union that specifies the terms under which an applicant state becomes a member of the European Union. In addition to the Treaty of Accession, a Final Act of Accession is signed. The Final Act registers the results of the accession negotiations, including declarations made by the parties. It also laid down arrangements for the period between signing and entry into force of the treaty.

Treaties in force
At the end of 2020, the following Accession Treaties were in force:
Treaty of Accession 1972, concerning Denmark, Ireland and the United Kingdom.
Treaty of Accession 1979, concerning Greece
Treaty of Accession 1985, concerning Spain and Portugal
Treaty of Accession 1994, concerning Austria, Finland and Sweden
Treaty of Accession 2003, concerning Czech Republic, Estonia, Cyprus, Latvia, Lithuania, Hungary, Malta, Poland, Slovenia, Slovakia
Treaty of Accession 2005, concerning Bulgaria and Romania
Treaty of Accession 2011, concerning Croatia

Proposed accessions
, the following proposals are being considered
 Accession of Albania to the European Union
 Accession of Bosnia and Herzegovina to the European Union
 Accession of Kosovo to the European Union
 Accession of Montenegro to the European Union
 Accession of North Macedonia to the European Union 
 Accession of Serbia to the European Union

Suspended or abandoned proposals
, these proposals are suspended or abandoned
 Accession of Iceland to the European Union
 Accession of Norway to the European Union
 Accession of Switzerland to the European Union
 Accession of Turkey to the European Union

See also
 Enlargement of the European Union
 Admission to the Union (equivalent in United States law)
 Withdrawal from the European Union (secession)

European Union law
Treaties of the European Union